Nancy Borowick (born 1985, Chappaqua, New York) is an American artist, photographer, and author. She studied photography at the International Center of Photography, and her work primarily documents family structures and personal histories to dissect how humans interact with, grieve, and memorialize loved ones. Her book The Family Imprint (2017) uses documentary photography and ephemera to tell the story of her parents who were both diagnosed with stage-four cancer and died within a year of each other. Her work has been shown in numerous solo and group exhibitions in the United States and abroad.

The Family Imprint
Borowick's project The Family Imprint began as a project at the International Center of Photography as she documented her mother who was diagnosed with stage-four cancer. The photographs mostly depict her parents in various stages of diagnosis, delight, joy, sadness, Borowick's own wedding, and her parents'  funerals. Borowick found difficulty in getting publishers interested in printing the book—many of which found the topic and the work too dark or solemn. In an attempt to both prove an audience existed for the project, Borowick launched a Kickstarter campaign that raised $65,313 to cover fees for printing, distribution, and a publishing agent. The book was published in 2017.

Awards

2018 

 Humanitarian Award by the Women That Soar organization
 German Photo Book Award for The Family Imprint, Bronze Prize

2017 

 PDN Photo Annual Book Prize, The Family Imprint (Hatje Cantz, 2017, dist. by DAP)
 International Photo Awards, 1st prize in Documentary Books & 2nd prize in People
 NPR Favorite Visual Stories of 2017
 Wall Street Journal Book Shelf 2017 for The Family Imprint
 Photo-Eye Best Books of 2017 for The Family Imprint
 Women Photograph, Best Books of 2017 for The Family Imprint

2016 

 World Press Photo, 2nd prize, Long Term Projects category, Amsterdam Finalist, World Report Award, Milan, Italy

2015 

 National Geographic + Visura contest, USA
 Arnold Newman Prize for New Directions in Photographic Portraiture

2014 

 Eddie Adams Workshop Award- Innovation in Visual Storytelling, USA
 Emerging Photographer Magazine, USA
 New York Photo Festival, Photo World, USA
 Lens Culture Top 5 Emerging Talent, exhibition in Spain, Japan & UK
 Best of ASMP 2014 featured photographer, USA

Selected exhibitions

2018 

 Head On Festival, Sydney, Australia
 Darmstadt Photo Days, Darmstadt, Germany
 German Cancer Congress Convention, Germany
 Dallas Center For Photography, Dallas, Texas, USA

2017 

 Anastasia Photo Gallery of New York City, USA
 Five-month public installation with United Photo Industries Gallery NYC, USA
 F3 Gallery- Freiraum fur fotografie, Berlin, Germany
 Objectifs Centre for Photography and Film, Singapore
 Trento Festival of Economics and Health Impacts, Trento, Italy
 Ono Cultural Center, Bern, Switzerland
 Union College Featured Alumni show, New York, USA

2016 

 World Press Photo International (Travelling show through 100 cities around the world) Festival of Ethical Photography, Lodi, Italy
 Lumix Festival, Hanover, Germany
 Photojourn Festival, Thailand
 Xaviar Miserachs Biennial, Girona, Spain
 Refraction Gallery, Wisconsin, USA

2015 

 Visa Pour L’Image Festival, Perpignan, France
 International Photo Festival, Leiden, Holland
 Guate Photo Festival New York Times Exhibition, Guatemala
 International Center of Photography Take Ten Alumni show
 Pop Up Mopla Emerging Photographer, Los Angeles, USA
 Just Another Photo Festival, New Delhi, India
 Photoville, New York Times feature, NYC, USA
 Celeste Familydom Show, Italy
 Look 3 Festival of the Photograph, Virginia, USA

2014 

 Visa Pour L’Image Festival projection, Perpignan, France
 Oberstdorf Fotogipfel Festiva, Oberstdorf, Germany
 Obscura Photo Festival, Malaysia
 Angkor Wat Photo Festival, Cambodia
 Valid Photo Gallery, Barcelona, Spain
 2013 Open Show featured projection of Cancer Family, USA

References

Further reading 

 
 
 
 
 
 
 

1985 births
Living people
21st-century American women photographers
21st-century American photographers
People from Chappaqua, New York
Photographers from New York (state)
Union College (New York) alumni
21st-century American women